The Gouwestreek (a Dutch word meaning the "Gouwe area") is the area around Gouda in the province of South Holland in the Netherlands. "Gouwe" refers to the (now canalised) river Gouwe, which runs through Gouda. The Gouwestreek is not an official or precisely defined region, but generally speaking it includes the following municipalities:

 Bodegraven-Reeuwijk
 Boskoop
 Gouda
 Waddinxveen
 Zuidplas

References

External links 
 Map of Gouwestreek on Google Maps

Regions of the Netherlands
Regions of South Holland
Gouda, South Holland